Arlington Heights is a census-designated place (CDP) in Snohomish County, Washington, United States. The population was 2,284 at the 2010 census.

Geography
Arlington Heights is located at  (48.208682, -122.052999).

Demographics
As of the census of 2000, there were 2,510 people, 838 households, and 682 families living in the CDP. The racial makeup of the CDP was 95.70% White, 0.24% African American, 0.40% Native American, 0.80% Asian, 0.92% from other races, and 1.95% from two or more races. Hispanic or Latino of any race were 1.75% of the population.

There were 838 households, out of which 39.0% had children under the age of 18 living with them, 70.9% were married couples living together, 6.9% had a female householder with no husband present, and 18.6% were non-families. 13.7% of all households were made up of individuals, and 4.5% had someone living alone who was 65 years of age or older. The average household size was 3.00 and the average family size was 3.27.

In the CDP, the age distribution of the population shows 29.5% under the age of 18, 7.0% from 18 to 24, 28.1% from 25 to 44, 26.2% from 45 to 64, and 9.2% who were 65 years of age or older. The median age was 38 years. For every 100 females, there were 101.9 males. For every 100 females age 18 and over, there were 96.8 males.

The median income for a household in the CDP was $60,518, and the median income for a family was $60,590. Males had a median income of $42,440 versus $31,250 for females. The per capita income for the CDP was $22,107. About 8.6% of families and 8.6% of the population were below the poverty line, including 14.1% of those under age 18 and 6.5% of those age 65 or over.

References

Census-designated places in Snohomish County, Washington
Census-designated places in Washington (state)